The Bremerhaven Radar Tower is a 106-metre reinforced concrete tower located in Bremerhaven, Germany. The radar tower, which was constructed between 1962 and 1965, accommodates numerous transmitting plants for maritime radio purposes, in addition to its radar equipment. A viewing platform is situated at the 60 metre level, and is accessible to the public.

Unlike other transmitting towers, the Bremerhaven facility belongs to the Bremerhaven Water and Shipping department and not Deutsche Telekom AG or a broadcasting corporation.

See also
 List of towers

External links

 
 Drawings of Bremerhaven Radar Tower

Communication towers in Germany
Radar Tower
Tourist attractions in Bremen (state)
1965 establishments in West Germany
Towers completed in 1965